Walter Gómez Pardal (12 December 1927 – 4 March 2004) was a Uruguayan footballer who played as a forward in the 1940s and 1950s. Throughout his career, he played for Club Nacional de Football and Club Atlético River Plate.

Gomez was a member of the outstanding Nacional side of the late 1940s, and he scored more than 100 goals for the club before moving to River Plate. That meant the end of his international career with Uruguay as only players within the domestic league could be picked for the Celestes. Gomez had made his international debut in 1945, at the age of just 18, but despite his talent he played only four times for the national team and never scored in international football.

At River he went on to win three league titles, and formed a new La Máquina side following the great team of the early 1940s.

Gomez played as a "media-punta" (second striker) at River alongside Ángel Labruna and Félix Loustau. At the end of his career at River he played with Omar Sívori. Such was the widespread admiration of the Uruguayan inside forward that in those times the saying "La gente ya no come para ver a Walter Gómez" became a popular theme in Buenos Aires.

External links

 

1927 births
2004 deaths
Uruguayan footballers
Uruguay international footballers
Uruguayan Primera División players
Argentine Primera División players
Serie A players
Serie B players
Categoría Primera A players
Club Nacional de Football players
Club Atlético River Plate footballers
Palermo F.C. players
Cúcuta Deportivo footballers
Once Caldas footballers
Uruguayan expatriate footballers
Expatriate footballers in Argentina
Expatriate footballers in Colombia
Expatriate footballers in Venezuela
Expatriate footballers in Italy
Uruguayan expatriate sportspeople in Italy
Association football inside forwards